The Crown of Castile was a medieval polity in the Iberian Peninsula that formed in 1230 as a result of the third and definitive union of the crowns and, some decades later, the parliaments of the kingdoms of Castile and León upon the accession of the then Castilian king, Ferdinand III, to the vacant Leonese throne. It continued to exist as a separate entity after the personal union in 1469 of the crowns of Castile and Aragon with the marriage of the Catholic Monarchs up to the promulgation of the Nueva Planta decrees by Philip V in 1715.

In 1492, the voyage of Christopher Columbus and the discovery of the Americas were major events in the history of Castile. The West Indies, Islands and Mainland of the Ocean Sea were also a part of the Crown of Castile when transformed from lordships to kingdoms of the heirs of Castile in 1506, with the Treaty of Villafáfila, and upon the death of Ferdinand the Catholic. The discovery of the Pacific Ocean, the conquest of the Aztec Empire, the conquest of the Inca Empire, the conquest of New Granada as well as the conquest of the Philippines all helped shape the Crown of Castile into a global empire in the 16th Century.

The title of "King of Castile" remained in use by the Habsburg rulers during the 16th and 17th centuries. Charles I was King of Aragon, Majorca, Valencia, and Sicily, and Count of Barcelona, Roussillon and Cerdagne, as well as King of Castile and León, 1516–1556.

In the early 18th century, Philip of Bourbon won the War of the Spanish Succession and imposed unification policies over the Crown of Aragon, supporters of their enemies. This unified the Crown of Aragon and the Crown of Castile into the kingdom of Spain. 
Even though the Nueva Planta decrees did not formally abolish the Crown of Castile, the country of (Castile and Aragon) was called "Spain" by both contemporaries and historians.

History

Preceding events

Two kingdoms: León and Castile

Towards unification
The Kingdom of León arose out of the Kingdom of Asturias. The Kingdom of Castile appeared initially as a county of the Kingdom of León. From the second half of the 10th century to the first half of the 11th century it changed hands between León and the Kingdom of Navarre. In the 11th century, it became a kingdom in its own right.

The two kingdoms had been united twice previously: 
From 1037 until 1065 under Ferdinand I of León. Upon his death his kingdoms passed to his sons, León to Alfonso VI, Castile to Sancho II, and Galicia to García.
From 1072 until 1157 under Alfonso VI (died 1109), Urraca (died 1126), and Alfonso VII. From 1111 until 1126 Galicia was separate from the union under Alfonso VII. In 1157 the kingdoms were divided between Alfonso's sons, with Ferdinand II receiving León and Sancho III Castile.

Occupation of western Navarre
From 1199 to 1201 under Alfonso VIII the Castilian king's armies invaded the Kingdom of Navarre, annexing thereafter Álava, Durangaldea and Gipuzkoa, including San Sebastián and Vitoria (Gasteiz). However, these western Basque territories saw their Navarrese charters confirmed under Castilian rule.

Crown of Castile from the rule of Ferdinand III until the ascension of Charles I

Union of the two kingdoms under Ferdinand III
Ferdinand III received the Kingdom of Castile from his mother, Queen Berengaria of Castile granddaughter of Sancho III in 1217, and the Kingdom of León from his father Alfonso IX of León son of Ferdinand II in 1230. From then on the two kingdoms were united under the name of the Kingdom of León and Castile, or simply as the Crown of Castile. Ferdinand III later conquered the Guadalquivir Valley, while his son Alfonso X conquered the Kingdom of Murcia from Al-Andalus, further extending the area of the Crown of Castile. Given this, the kings of the Crown of Castile traditionally styled themselves "King of Castile, León, Toledo, Galicia, Murcia, Jaén, Córdoba, Seville, and Lord of Biscay and Molina", among other possessions they later gained. The heir to the throne has been titled Prince of Asturias since the 14th century.

Union of the Cortes and the legal code

Almost immediately after the union of the two kingdoms under Ferdinand III, the parliaments of Castile and León were united. It was divided into three estates, which corresponded with the nobility, the church and the cities, and included representation from Castile, León, Galicia, Toledo, and the Basque Provinces. Initially the number of cities represented in the Cortes varied over the next century, until John I permanently set those that would be allowed to send representatives (procuradores): Burgos, Toledo, León, Sevilla, Córdoba, Murcia, Jaén, Zamora, Segovia, Ávila, Salamanca, Cuenca, Toro, Valladolid, Soria, Madrid and Guadalajara (with Granada added after its conquest in 1492).

Under Alfonso X, most sessions of the Cortes of both kingdoms were held jointly. The Cortes of 1258 in Valladolid comprised representatives of Castile, Extremadura and León ("de Castiella e de Estremadura e de tierra de León") and those of Seville in 1261 of Castile, León and all other kingdoms ("de Castiella e de León e de todos los otros nuestros Regnos"). Subsequent Cortes were celebrated separately, for example in 1301 that of Castile in Burgos and that of León in Zamora, but the representatives demanded that the parliaments be reunited from then on.

Although the individual kingdoms and cities initially retained their individual historical rights-including the Old Fuero of Castile (Viejo Fuero de Castilla) and the different fueros of the municipal councils of Castile, León, Extremadura and Andalucía-a unified legal code for the entire new kingdom was created in the Siete Partidas (c. 1265), the Ordenamiento de Alcalá (1348) and the Leyes de Toro (1505). These laws continued to be in force until 1889, when a new Spanish civil code, the Código Civil Español, was enacted.

Spanish languages and universities

In the 13th century there were many languages spoken in the Kingdoms of León and Castile among them Castilian, Leonese, Basque and Galician-Portuguese. But, as the century progressed, Castilian gained increasing prominence as the language of culture and communication- one example of this is the Cantar de Mio Cid.

In the last years of the reign of Ferdinand III, Castilian began to be used for some important documents, such as the Visigothic Code, the basis of the legal code for Christians living in Muslim Cordova, but it was during the reign of Alfonso X that it became the official language. Henceforth all public documents were written in Castilian, likewise all translations of Arabic legal and government documents were made into Castilian instead of Latin.

Some scholars think that the substitution of Castilian for Latin was due to the strength of the new language, whereas others consider that it was due to the influence of Hebrew-speaking intellectuals who were hostile towards Latin, the language of the Christian Church.

In 1492, under the Catholic Monarchs, the first edition of the Grammar of the Castilian Language by Antonio de Nebrija was published. Castilian was eventually carried to the Americas in the 16th century by the conquistadors. Because of Castilian's importance in the land ruled by the Spanish Crown, the language is also known as Spanish.

Furthermore, in the 13th century many universities were founded where instruction was in Castilian, such as the Leonese University of Salamanca, the Castilian Estudio General of Palencia and the University of Valladolid, which were among the first universities in Europe.

In the 13th century, emerging groups of local grazers coalesced into the powerful Mesta, the headpin for wool trade over the following three centuries. In time, Castile would become a leading export market for wool in the late middle ages.

Ascension of the Trastámara dynasty

The Castilian Civil War pitting supporters of Henry of Trastámara against Peter I entailed a struggle of competing factions, with the former party being favoured by the Castilian nobility (and, to a lesser extent, the Clergy), whereas the latter party lied on the side of Jews', conversos''' and town councils' interests. A substantial transfer from the royal patrimony to the nobles ensued upon the prevail of the Trastámaras in the conflict. Likewise, the resulting dynastic change ran parallel to a radicalization of the antisemitic sentiment in Castile.

On the death of Alfonso XI a dynastic conflict started between his sons, the Infantes Peter (Pedro) and Henry, Count of Trastámara, which became entangled in the Hundred Years' War (between England and France). Alfonso XI had married Maria of Portugal with whom he had his heir, the Infante Peter. However, the King also had many illegitimate children with Eleanor of Guzman, among them the above-mentioned Henry, who disputed Peter's right to the throne once the latter became king.

In the resulting struggle, in which both brothers claimed to be king, Pedro allied himself with Edward, Prince of Wales, "the Black Prince". In 1367, the Black Prince defeated Henry II's allies at the Battle of Nájera, restoring Pedro's control of the kingdom. The Black Prince, seeing that the king would not reimburse his expenses, left Castile. Henry, who had fled to France, took advantage of the opportunity and recommenced the fight. Henry finally was victorious in 1369 in the Battle of Montiel, in which he had Peter killed.

In 1371 the brother of the Black Prince, John of Gaunt, 1st Duke of Lancaster, married Constance, Peter's daughter. In 1386, he claimed the Crown of Castile in the name of his wife, the legitimate heir according to the Cortes de Seville of 1361. He arrived in A Coruña with an army and took the city. He then moved on to occupy Santiago de Compostela, Pontevedra and Vigo. He asked John I, Henry II's son, to give up the throne in favor of Constance.

John declined but proposed that his son, the Infante Henry, marry John of Gaunt's daughter Catherine. The proposal was accepted, and the title Prince of Asturias was created for Henry and Catherine. This ended the dynastic conflict, strengthened the House of Trastámara's position and created peace between England and Castile.

Relations with the Crown of Aragon during the 14th century

During the reign of Henry III royal power was restored, overshadowing the much powerful Castilian nobility. In his later years Henry delegated some of his power to his brother Ferdinand I of Antequera, who would be regent, along with his wife Catherine of Lancaster, during the childhood of his son John II. After the Compromise of Caspe in 1412, Ferdinand left Castile to become King of Aragon.

Upon the death of his mother, John II at the age of 14, took to the throne and married his cousin Maria of Aragon. The young king entrusted his government to regent Álvaro de Luna, the most influential person in court and allied with the lesser nobility, the cities, the clergy, and the Jews. This brought together the mutual dislikes of the king shared by the greater Castilian nobility and the Aragonese Infantes, sons of Ferdinand I of Antequera, who sought to control the Castilian crown. This eventually led to war in 1429 and 1430 between the two kingdoms. Álvaro de Luna won the war and expelled the Aragonese Infantes from Castile.

Second Conflict of Succession

Henry IV unsuccessfully tried to re-establish the peace with the nobility that his father, John II, had shattered. When his second wife, Joan of Portugal, gave birth to Infanta Joanna, it was claimed that she was the result of an affair of the Queen with Beltrán de la Cueva, one of the King's chief ministers.

The King, besieged by riots and the demands of the nobles, had to sign a treaty in which he named as his successor his half-brother Alfonso, leaving Infanta Joanna out of the line of succession. After the death of Alfonso in an accident, Henry IV signed the Treaty of the Bulls of Guisando with his half-sister Isabella I in which he named her heiress in return for her marrying a prince chosen by him.

Catholic Monarchs: Union with the Crown of Aragon

In October 1469 Isabella I and Ferdinand II, heir to the throne of Aragon, married in secret in the Palacio de los Vivero in Castilian Valladolid. The consequence was a dynastic union of the Crown of Castile and the Crown of Aragon in 1479 when Ferdinand ascended to the Aragonese throne. This union however was not effective until the reign of his grandson Charles I (Holy Roman Emperor Charles V). Ferdinand and Isabella were related and had married without papal approval. Although Isabella wanted to marry Ferdinand, she refused to proceed with the marriage until she received a Papal dispensation. Consequently, Ferdinand's father forged a papal dispensation for the two to marry. Isabella believed that the dispensation was authentic and the marriage went ahead. A genuine papal dispensation arrived afterwards. Later Pope Alexander VI bestowed upon them the title of 'los Reyes Católicos' ('the Catholic Monarchs').

Henry IV, half brother of Isabella, considered the marriage of Ferdinand and Isabella as breaking the Treaty of the Bulls of Guisando, under which Isabella would ascend to the Castilian throne on his death only if her suitor was approved by him. Henry wanted to ally Castile with Portugal or France rather than Aragon. He therefore decided to name his daughter Infanta Joanna as heiress to the throne rather than Isabella I. When he died in 1474 the War of the Castilian Succession broke out over who would ascend to the throne. It lasted until 1479 when Isabella and her supporters came out victorious.

After Isabella's victory in the civil war and Ferdinand's ascension to the Aragonese throne the two crowns were united under the same monarchs. However, this was a personal union and both kingdoms remained administratively separate to some extent, each maintaining largely its own laws; both parliaments remained separate, the only common institution would be the Inquisition. Despite their titles of "Monarchs of Castile, Leon, Aragon and Sicily" Ferdinand and Isabella reigned over their respective territories, although they also took decisions together. Its central position, larger territorial area (three times greater than that of Aragon) and larger population (4.3 million as opposed to the 1 million in Aragon) led to Castile becoming the dominating partner in the union.

As a result of the Reconquista (Reconquest) the Castilian aristocracy had become very powerful. The monarchs needed to assert their authority over the nobility and the clergy. With this end in mind they founded a law enforcement body, the Consejo de la Hermandad, more commonly known as the Santa Hermandad (the Holy Brotherhood), which was staffed and funded by the municipalities. They also took further measures against the nobility, destroying feudal castles, prohibiting private wars and reducing the power of the Adelantados (a governor-like military office in regions recently conquered). The monarchy incorporated military orders under the Consejo de las Órdenes in 1495, reinforced royal judicial power over the feudal one and transformed the Audiencias into the supreme judicial bodies. The crown also sought to better control the cities, and so in 1480 in the Cortes of Toledo it created the corregidores, representatives of the crown, which supervised the city councils. In religion, they reformed religious orders and sought unity of the various sections of the church. They pressured Jews to convert to Catholicism, in some cases persecuted by the Inquisition. Finally in 1492, the monarchs decided that those who would not convert would be expelled. It is estimated that between 50,000 and 70,000 people were expelled from Castile. From 1502 onwards, they began to convert the Muslim population.

Between 1478 and 1497 the monarchs' forces conquered the three Canary Islands of Gran Canaria, La Palma and Tenerife. On 2 January 1492 the monarchs entered Granada's Alhambra marking the completion and end of the Reconquista. Also in 1492, the Christopher Columbus maritime expedition claimed the newly found lands in the Americas for the Crown of Castile and began the New World conquests. In 1497 Castile conquered Melilla on the north coast of North Africa. After Castile's conquest of the Kingdom of Granada, its politics turned towards the Mediterranean, and Castile militarily helped Aragon in its problems with France, culminating in the reconquest of Naples for the Crown of Aragon in 1504. Later that same year, Queen Isabella died, on November 26.

Period of regency – Joanna I
Upon Queen Isabella I's death 1504, the crown passed to her daughter Joanna, who was married to Philip of Austria (nicknamed 'Philip the Handsome'). But Isabella knew of her daughter's possible mental health incapacities (and so nicknamed 'Juana la Loca' or 'Joanna the Mad' ) and named Ferdinand as regent in the case that Joanna "didn't want to or couldn't fulfil her duties". In the 'Salamanca Agreement' of 1505, it was decided that the government would be shared by Philip I, Ferdinand V and Joanna. However, poor relations between Phillip, who was supported by the Castilian nobility, and Ferdinand resulted in Ferdinand renouncing his regent's powers in Castile in order to avoid an armed conflict.

Through the Concordia de Villafáfila of 1506, Ferdinand returned to Aragon and Phillip was recognized as King of Castile, with Joanna a co-monarch. In the Treaty of Villafáfila in 1506 King Ferdinand the Catholic renounced not only the government of Castile in favour of his son-in-law Philip I of Castile but also the lordship of the Indies, withholding a half of the income of the kingdoms of the Indies. Joanna of Castile and Philip immediately added to their titles the kingdoms of Indies, Islands and Mainland of the Ocean Sea. Phillip died and Ferdinand returned in 1507 once again to be regent for Joanna. Her isolated confinement-imprisonment in the Santa Clara Convent at Tordesillas, to last over forty years until death, began with her father's orders in 1510.

In 1512 a joint Castilian-Aragonese force invaded Navarre and most of the Kingdom of Navarre south of the Pyrenees was annexed to Castile.

Crown of Castile within Habsburg Spain

Charles I

Charles I received the Crown of Castile, the Crown of Aragon and the empire through a combination of dynastic marriages and premature deaths:
when his father Philip I died in 1506, he became sovereign of the Netherlands;
upon the death of Ferdinand II of Aragon, his grandfather, in 1516 he gained the rule of Aragon and Castile (with the Americas), in co-regency title with his mother Queen Joanna. He maintained her confinement-imprisonment, so she was Queen of Aragon and of Castile in title only.
upon the death of Maximilian, his paternal grandfather, in 1519, Charles was elected Holy Roman Emperor as a consequence of which he is better-known as Charles V, Holy Roman Emperor.

Charles I was not well received in Castile. This was partly because he was a foreign-born king (born in Ghent), and even before his arrival in Castile he had granted important positions to Flemish citizens and had used Castilian money to fund his court. The Castilian nobility and the cities were on the verge of an uprising to defend their rights. Many Castilians favoured the king's younger brother Ferdinand, who grew up in Castile, and in fact the Council of Castile opposed the idea of Charles as King of Castile.

In 1518 the Castilian parliament in Valladolid named the Wallonian Jean de Sauvage as its president. This caused angry protests in the parliament, which rejected the presence of foreigners in its deliberations. Despite threats, the parliament led by Juan de Zumel representing Burgos, resisted and forced the king to respect the laws of Castile, remove all foreigners from important governmental posts, and learn to speak Castilian. After taking his oath, Charles received a subsidy of 600,000 ducats.

Charles was conscious of the fact that he had options to become emperor and needed to impose his authority over Castile to gain access to its riches for his imperial goals. The riches from the Americas came through Castile which was one of the more dynamic, rich, and advanced territories in Europe in the 16th century. It started to realise that it could become immersed within an empire. This, added to the broken promise of Charles, only increased hostility towards the king. In 1520 in Toledo Parliament rejected a further subsidy for the king. Parliament in Santiago de Compostela reached the same decision. Finally, when Parliament was held in A Coruña, many members were bribed and others denied entry, with the result that the subsidy was approved. Those members who voted in favour were attacked by the Castilian people and their houses were burned. Parliament was not the only opposition which Charles would come up against. When he left Castile in 1520, the Castilian War of the Communities broke out, and the revolts released Joanna, claiming to support her to be the sole monarch and encouraging her to agree the dethronement of Charles. While sympathetic to revolts, Joanna however refused to sign any documents to support them or depose her son. Los comuneros were defeated one year later (1521). After their defeat, Parliament was reduced to a merely consultative body. To prevent Joanna from being proposed to be an alternative monarch by opponents again, Charles continued her confinement until her death in 1555, after which Charles became the only monarch of Spain.

Imperial policies of Philip II
Philip II continued the politics of Charles I, but unlike his father he made Castile the core of the Spanish Empire, centralising all administration in Madrid. The other Spanish regions maintained certain degree of autonomy, being governed by a Viceroy.

In fact, since the reign of Charles I the financial burden of the empire had fallen mainly on Castile, but under Philip II the cost quadrupled. During his reign, as well as increasing existing taxes he created some new ones, among them the excusado in 1567. That same year Philip ordered the proclamation of the La Pragmática; an act whereby all Moriscos had to abandon all Moorish traditions and become true Catholics. This edict limited religious, linguistic and cultural freedom of the Morisco population and provoked the Morisco Revolt (1568–1571), which was put down by John of Austria.

Castile entered a phase of recession in 1575; Spain as a whole followed, which provoked the suspension of wages (the third of his reign). In 1590 the Cortes approved the millones; a new tax on food. This exhausted Castilian cities and hindered the economy. In 1596, pay was once again suspended.

Later Habsburgs

In the previous kingdoms, positions in national institutions were filled by educated gentlemen. Philip II's administrators would normally come from either the University of Alcalá or the University of Salamanca. After Philip III the nobility once again asserted their right to govern the country. In order to show that there was a new order ruling there was a cleansing of the blood of Spain. Religious persecution led Philip to declare the expulsion of the Moriscos in 1609.

Faced with the collapse of the Exchequer, in order to maintain the hegemony of Philip IV's Spanish Empire, the Count-Duke of Olivares, the king's favourite (valido) from 1621 to 1643, tried to introduce a series of reforms. Among these was the Unión de Armas, the creation of a new army of 140,000 reservists. Every territory within the kingdom contributed citizens proportionally in order to maintain the force. His aims of union did not work and the Spanish Crown continued as a confederation of kingdoms.

Luis Méndez de Haro took over from Olivares as favourite Philip IV between 1659 and 1665. This was in order to alleviate interior conflicts sparked off by his predecessor (revolts in Portugal, Catalonia and Andalusia) and achieve peace in Europe.

Upon the death of Philip IV in 1665, and with the incapacity of Charles II to govern, Spain suffered an economic slowdown and battles for power between the different 'favourites'. The death of Charles II in 1700 without descendants provoked the War of the Spanish Succession.

After the war, all the territories were unified as a single country under the Crown of Spain.

Spanish territorial divisions within the Crown of Castile

In Spain
Kingdom of Castille/Reino de Castilla
Kingdom of León/Reino de León
Principality of Asturias/Principado de Asturias
Kingdom of Galicia/Reino de Galicia
Lordship of Biscay/Señorío de Vizcaya
Province of Gipuzkoa/Provincia de Guipúzcoa
Province of Álava/Provincia de Álava
Extremadura
Kingdom of Toledo/Reino de Toledo
Kingdom of Murcia/Reino de Murcia
Kingdom of Córdoba/Reino de Córdoba
Kingdom of Jaén/Reino de Jaén
Kingdom of Seville/Reino de Sevilla
Kingdom of Granada/Reino de Granada (after 1492)
Kingdom of Navarre/Reino de Navarra (after 1512)

Overseas (before 1715)
Kingdom of the Canaries/Reino de Canarias
Viceroyalty of the Indies/Virreinato de las Indias (1492-1535)

North – SeptentrionalViceroyalty of New Spain/Virreinato de la Nueva España (after 1535)
Kingdom of Mexico/Reino de México (administered by the Royal Audience of Mexico, presided directly by the Vice-roy of New Spain)
New Kingdom of Galicia/Nuevo Reino de Galicia
Captaincy General of Guatemala or Kingdom of Guatemala/Capitanía General de Guatemala or Reino de Guatemala
Kingdom of New Biscay/Reino de Nueva Vizcaya
New Kingdom of León/Nuevo Reino de Léon
Santa Fe of New Mexico/Santa Fe de Nuevo México
New Extremadura/Nueva Extremadura
Province of New Navarre/Provincia de Nueva Navarra
Province of the Californias/Provincia de Las Californias
Provincia de Venezuela/Provincia de Venezuela
Captaincy General of the Philippines/Capitanía General de las Filipinas
Captaincy General of Cuba/Capitanía General de Cuba
Captaincy General of Puerto Rico/Capitanía General de Puerto Rico
Captaincy General of Santo Domingo/Capitanía General de Santo Domingo
Captaincy General of Yucatán/Capitanía General de Yucatán
South – Meridional''
Viceroyalty of Peru/Virreinato del Perú (after 1542)
Province of Tierra Firme/Provincia de Tierra Firme (administered by the Royal Audiencia of Panama [1st one, 1538–43], [2nd one, 1564–1751])
New Kingdom of Granada/Nuevo Reino de Granada (administered by the Royal Audience of Santa Fe de Bogotá)
Kingdom of Quito or Presidency of Quito/Reino de Quito or Presidencia de Quito (administered by the Royal Audiencia of Quito)
Kingdom of Peru/Reino de Peru (administered by the Royal Audiencia of Lima, presided directly by the Vice-roy of Peru)
Province of Charcas/Provincia de Charcas (administered by the Royal Audiencia of Charcas)
Captaincy General of Chile/Capitanía General de Chile (unofficially referred as Kingdom of Chile/Reino de Chile)
Governorate of the Río de la Plata/Gobernácion del Río de la Plata (administered by the Royal Audiencia of Buenos Aires) (1661–72)

In the viceroyalties the viceroy, whose term etymologically means "in the place of the king", concentrated all public power. They was freely appointed and removed by the Monarch, when the sovereign wanted he/she could remove the viceroy of the office. In New Spain and Peru they played the role of sovereign, but in reality they only obeyed the orders of the Monarch of the Crown of Castile.

See also
Heraldry of Castile
Heraldry of León
List of Castilian Monarchs

Notes

References

Further reading

History of Castile
Former monarchies of Europe
States and territories established in 1230
States and territories disestablished in 1715
Former countries in Europe
1715 disestablishments in Europe
1230 establishments in Europe